Cornamagh is a townland in Athlone, County Westmeath, Ireland. The townland is in the civil parish of St. Mary's.

The townland, which is bordered by Coosan to the west, is in the north of the town. Dubarry Park stands in the townland.

References 

Townlands of County Westmeath